Ab Razgeh (also Romanized as Āb Razgeh and Āb-e Razgeh; also known as Āb Zargeh and Āb Zarkeh) is a village in Tayebi-ye Garmsiri-ye Shomali Rural District, in the Central District of Landeh County, Kohgiluyeh and Boyer-Ahmad Province, Iran. At the 2006 census, its population was 261, in 46 families.

References 

Populated places in Landeh County